Thomas Jefferson Page (January 4, 1808 -October 23, 1899, Rome) was a career officer in the United States Navy.  Under his command USS Water Witch made the first detailed hydrological studies of the River Plate basin.  When Virginia seceded, he resigned to serve in the Confederate Army and later its Navy. Late in the war, Page was captain of the ironclad CSS Stonewall. 

After the war, he moved to Argentina, where there developed an American community of former Confederates in exile. He was politically active and established a cattle ranch. He assisted the government with its defensive installations and modernizing its navy. After serving as secretary to the Argentine diplomatic mission to Italy, Page moved to Rome with his family. They became part of its American community. He died there in 1899 and was buried in the Protestant Cemetery, Rome.

Early life 
Page was born January 4, 1808, at Rosewell plantation in Virginia, the fourteenth son of Mann Page. His mother was Elizabeth Nelson, a daughter of Thomas Nelson Jr., a signer of the Declaration of Independence, and his wife.

United States Navy career 
In 1827 Page was appointed a cadet at the United States Naval Academy by President John Quincy Adams, in recognition of the services of his grandfathers. He graduated with honors in a class of forty-five members.

Page served in the Caribbean, carried out a hydrographical survey of the New York coastline, and worked under Lieutenant  Matthew Fontaine Maury at the Naval Observatory in Washington. He battled Japanese pirates in the brig USS Dolphin at the mouth of the Yangtze River at the request of the Qing Government. Due to personal reservations about the interests of western powers in China, Page did not accompany Admiral Perry's expedition to the Far East.

Following this, Lieutenant Page commanded the USS Water Witch in which during 1853–56 he explored the South American Río de la Plata basin. This included sailing into its tributaries, the rivers Paraná, Paraguay (and its tributaries the rivers Bermejo and Apa); and the Uruguay. In all, his crew made the first detailed hydrological studies of the Rio de la Plata.  While he was in Paraguayan waters, his ship was fired on by the Paraguayan fort Itapirú, killing his helmsman.  

The US retaliated with the Paraguay expedition.  The United States government ordered an expedition of redress against Paraguay; this, however, eventually came to nothing. Page wrote an account of the La Plata expedition, which was published in 1859.

American Civil War 
After Virginia seceded from the Union, Commander Page resigned from the United States Navy to take up the defense of Virginia. During the ensuing Civil War, he became a Colonel of Artillery and commanded batteries defending the Confederate capital, Richmond. In May 1863, Page was commissioned as a Captain in the Confederate Navy and was sent to Europe to purchase vessels. In the last months of the Civil War, he commanded the Confederate ironclad ram CSS Stonewall. But by the time he could get his new ship from Europe to North American waters, the war was over. Captain Page sailed to Havana, where he turned the ship over to the Spanish authorities, as they had supported some Confederate efforts.

Later life 
After the war, Page moved to Argentina. Along with other Confederate exiles, he engaged in politics and cattle farming. He assisted in developing Argentine coastal defenses and enhancing the capacity and modernization of the Argentine Navy. He introduced numerous modern ideas into strategic and tactical naval formations of Argentina, making it a formidable force throughout the 19th century. He tried, unsuccessfully, to interest the Argentine Navy in a torpedo ship developed by Swedish-American John Ericsson, the inventor of the USS Monitor. 

Page served as secretary to the Argentine diplomatic mission to Italy. Page and his family eventually moved to Rome, Italy, where they became mainstays of the American expatriate community there. Page was affectionately called "the Commodore." He died October 23, 1899. He is buried in the Protestant Cemetery, Rome. His tomb was engraved to read: "Thomas Jefferson Page of Virginia; Captain, U.S.N. and C.S.N., Explorer, Christian Gentleman”. It was restored in the late 20th century by the Sons of Confederate Veterans. 

Descendants of his family, along with those of his younger cousins, are far flung, residing in Argentina, the European Union, the United States, Japan, and China.  Thomas Nelson Page and William Nelson Page were his younger cousins. Thomas Nelson Page served as Ambassador to Italy during the administration of President Woodrow Wilson. He visited the grave of his cousin.

References

External links

United States Navy officers
Confederate States Navy captains
1808 births
1899 deaths
Burials in the Protestant Cemetery, Rome